Albert Edward Lawton (31 March 1879 – 25 December 1955) was an English cricketer who played first-class cricket for Derbyshire between 1900 and 1910 and for Lancashire between 1912 and 1914. He captained the Derbyshire team between 1902 and 1905 and also played for London County and Marylebone Cricket Club (MCC).

Early life
Lawton was born at Dukinfield, Cheshire, the son of John Edward Lawton and his wife Ellen. His father owned a cotton spinning business at Dukinfield and in 1883 Frederic Charles Arkwright brought him to Matlock, Derbyshire to revive Masson Mill to meet the growing market for sewing thread generated by the popularity of sewing machines. Lawton senior built a substantial mansion Woodbank, later Cromford Court, overlooking Masson Mill.

Cricket career
Lawton made his debut for Derbyshire in the 1900 season and remained with the team until 1910. He also played matches for London County from 1900 to 1903 and for the Marylebone Cricket Club (MCC) from 1905 to 1914. Lawton captained Derbyshire between 1902 and 1905, although for part of 1904 Maynard Ashcroft held the captaincy. In 1902 he hit three of his ten first-class centuries, all at Derby. He scored 149 in two and a quarter hours against W.G. Grace's London County, 146 against Hampshire and 126 in just over two hours against Warwickshire. He scored 1,044 runs in the 1902 season with an average of 27.47.

The Lawton family left Matlock around 1910 and Lawton then played for Lancashire from 1912 to 1914. His last significant game was a one-off match for MCC in 1920. Lawton was a right hand batsman who played 314 innings in 182 first-class matches. His highest score was 168 and his average 24.78. He was a right arm slow-medium bowler who took 113 wickets with an average of 31.92. While he was captain, Derbyshire ended the season twice at 10th in the table and otherwise 12th and 14th. Wisden described Lawton as "very tall" and a "prodigious hitter".

Lawton died at Manchester aged 76.

References

1879 births
1955 deaths
English cricketers
Derbyshire cricket captains
Lancashire cricketers
People from Dukinfield
Marylebone Cricket Club cricketers
London County cricketers
Gentlemen cricketers
North v South cricketers
Gentlemen of England cricketers
H. D. G. Leveson Gower's XI cricketers
W. G. Grace's XI cricketers